IPK may refer to:

 International Prototype of the Kilogram, an object that was used to define the kilogram
 IPK Acrylic-polyvinyl chloride, a plastic material
 Inositol polyphosphate kinase, a family of enzymes 
 Iñupiaq language of Alaska and Northwest Territories (ISO 639-3 code: ipk)
 Iisalmen Peli-Karhut, an ice hockey team in Finland